Annandale, also known as Alpine Farms, is a historic home located at Gilmore Mills, Botetourt County, Virginia. It was built in 1835, and is a two-story, Greek Revival-style brick dwelling with a deck-on-hip roof.  It has a one-story, three bay, wooden front porch with tapering square columns.  A two-story brick west wing and a single story frame ell, were added in 1969.  Also on the property is a contributing brick dairy or meathouse.

It was listed on the National Register of Historic Places in 1993.

References

Houses on the National Register of Historic Places in Virginia
Greek Revival houses in Virginia
Houses completed in 1835
Houses in Botetourt County, Virginia
National Register of Historic Places in Botetourt County, Virginia